Madison–Barbour Rural Historic District is a national historic district located near Barboursville, Orange County, Virginia. It encompasses 775 contributing buildings, 233 contributing sites, 111 contributing structures, and 1 contributing object. The district is best known for its large estates with imposing Federal and Georgian-style mansions, but also contains exemplary groupings of agricultural buildings, vernacular dwellings, and locally significant religious, commercial, and transportation-related structures. Located in the district are the separately listed Barboursville and Montpelier.

It was listed on the National Register of Historic Places in the year 1991.

References

Historic districts in Orange County, Virginia
Georgian architecture in Virginia
Federal architecture in Virginia
Colonial Revival architecture in Virginia
National Register of Historic Places in Orange County, Virginia
Historic districts on the National Register of Historic Places in Virginia